Burlingame Junior-Senior High School is a fully accredited public high school located in Burlingame, Kansas, in the Burlingame USD 454 school district, serving students in grades 7-12. Burlingame has an enrollment of approximately 171 students. The principal is Tammy Baird. The school mascot is the Bearcat and the school colors are purple and white.

Extracurricular activities
The Bearcats compete in the Lyon County League. The KSHSAA classification is 2A, the second lowest class. The school also has a variety of organizations for the students to participate in.

Athletics
The Bearcats compete in the Lyon County League and are classified as 2A the second lowest classification in Kansas according to KSHSAA. A majority of the sports are coached by the same coaches. Burlingame Junior-Senior High School offers the following sports:

 Fall Sports
 Cheerleading
 Boys' Cross-Country
 Girls' Cross-Country
 Football
 Volleyball

 Winter
 Boys' Basketball
 Girls' Basketball
 Cheerleading
 Wrestling

 Spring
 Baseball
 Golf
 Softball
 Boys' Track and Field
 Girls' Track and Field

Organizations
 Band
 Future Business Leaders of America (FBLA)
 KAY Club
 National Honor Society (NHS)
 Scholars Bowl
 Student Council (StuCo)

Carla Provost, Chief of U.S. Border Patrol, 2017-2020 
 Ron Thornburgh, Kansas Secretary of State, 1995-2010

See also

 List of high schools in Kansas
 List of unified school districts in Kansas

References

External links
 
 USD 454 School District Boundary Map, KDOT

Public high schools in Kansas
Public middle schools in Kansas
Education in Osage County, Kansas